The River of Doubt: Theodore Roosevelt's Darkest Journey is a 2005 book by Candice Millard covering president Theodore Roosevelt's scientific expedition down the River of Doubt (later renamed the Roosevelt River), in Brazil. Millard's first book, it went on to become a Book Sense pick, winner of the William Rockhill Nelson Award, and a finalist for the Quill Awards.

Critical reception
Millard's book received praise from editors of various news organizations and was listed on The New York Times Best Seller list. Bruce Barcott of the New York Times described it as, "an exhilarating story," and Tahir Shah of The Washington Post called it "a truly gripping tale."

In 2010, Kathy Hickman of The Sun Chronicle described the book, "as a bracing and inspiring start to the new year, you won't find a better tale."

References

External links
Interview with Candice Millard on her book, November 3, 2005 on NPR
 Author Candice Millard discusses the Roosevelt book that made her a best-seller, September 13, 2017 on WIBW

2005 non-fiction books
American biographies
Books about Theodore Roosevelt
Presidency of Theodore Roosevelt
Random House books
Books by Candice Millard
Broadway Books books